IROC XVIII was the eighteenth year of IROC competition, which took place in 1994. It was the first year the Dodge Avenger was used in competition, replacing the Dodge Daytona, and continued the format introduced in IROC XVIII. Race one took place on the Daytona International Speedway, race two took place at Darlington Raceway, race three ran at Talladega Superspeedway, and the year finished at Michigan International Speedway. Mark Martin won the series championship, and $200,000.

The roster of drivers and final points standings were as follows:

Race results

Race One, Daytona International Speedway
Friday, February 18, 1994

one *: Bonus points for leading the most laps.two **: Bonus points for leading the 2nd most laps.three ***: Bonus points for leading the 3rd most laps.

Average speed: 180.632 mphCautions: 1 (lap 23, Scott Sharp Crash)Margin of victory: .5 clLead changes: 13

Race Two, Darlington Raceway
Saturday, March 26, 1994

one *: Bonus points for leading the most laps.two **: Bonus points for leading the 2nd most laps.three ***: Bonus points for leading the 3rd most laps (did not occur in this race so not awarded).

Average speed: 144.083 mphCautions: 3Margin of victory: .25 secLead changes: 2

Notes:

This race was originally scheduled for 60 laps with a break in-between but was shortened to 46 laps due to an extra long break. During the first half of the race the teams were having overheating problems due to rubber build up on the grills on the cars. It got so bad that Dave Marcis and other IROC officials were using wire brushes to clean the grills on the cars. They also had to check the water in the radiator of the cars due to the overheating problems. 
Due to the long break IROC shortened the race to 46 laps. The track had second round qualifying for the NASCAR Winston Cup Series and the NASCAR Busch Grand National race later in the day to get in, forcing IROC to shorten the race.

Race Three, Talladega Superspeedway
Saturday, April 30, 1994

one *: Bonus points for leading the most laps.two **: Bonus points for leading the 2nd most laps.three ***: Bonus points for leading the 3rd most laps.

Average speed: 186.323 mphCautions: 1Margin of victory: .37 secLead changes: 6

Race Four, Michigan International Speedway
Saturday, July 30, 1994

one *: Bonus points for leading the most laps.two **: Bonus points for leading the 2nd most laps.three ***: Bonus points for leading the 3rd most laps.

Average speed: 150.387 mphCautions: 3Margin of victory: .35 secLead changes: 7

Cautions

Lap Leader Breakdown

Notes
 Al Unser Jr., Rusty Wallace, and Dale Earnhardt tied for second place in points. They were ordered based on their finishing position in the final race.

References

External links
IROC XVIII History - IROC Website

International Race of Champions
1994 in American motorsport